Dagmar Bilková (born January 15, 1967 in Zvolen) is a sport shooter who has competed for Czechoslovakia and the Czech Republic. She participated in rifle shooting events at the Summer Olympics in 1988, 1992, and 1996.

Olympic results

References

1967 births
Living people
Sportspeople from Zvolen
ISSF rifle shooters
Czech female sport shooters
Shooters at the 1988 Summer Olympics
Shooters at the 1992 Summer Olympics
Shooters at the 1996 Summer Olympics
Olympic shooters of Czechoslovakia
Olympic shooters of the Czech Republic